Abū Dāwūd (Dā’ūd) Sulaymān ibn al-Ash‘ath ibn Isḥāq al-Azdī al-Sijistānī, commonly known as Abū Dāwūd al-Sijistānī, was a scholar of prophetic hadith who compiled the third of the six "canonical" hadith collections recognized by Sunni Muslims, the Sunan Abu Dāwūd. He was a Persian speaker of Arab descent.

Biography
Abū Dā’ūd was born in Sistan and died in 889 in Basra. He travelled widely collecting ḥadīth (traditions) from scholars in numerous locations including Iraq, Egypt, Syria, Hijaz, Tihamah, Nishapur and Merv. His focus on legal ḥadīth arose from a particular interest in fiqh (law). His collection included 4,800 ḥadīth, selected from some 500,000. His son, Abū Bakr ‘Abd Allāh ibn Abī Dā’ūd (died 928/929), was a well known ḥāfiẓ and author of Kitāb al-Masābīh, whose famous pupil was Abū 'Abd Allāh al-Marzubānī.

School of thought and Quotes
Imam Abu Dawud was a follower of Hanbali although some have considered him Shafi.

Imam Abu Dawud has stated:  "From this book of mine four Hadith are sufficient for an intelligent and insightful person. They are:
 Deeds are to be judged only by intentions.
 Part of a man's good observance of Islam is that he leaves alone that which does not concern him.
 None of you can be a believer unless you love for your brother that which you love for yourself.
 The permitted (halal) is clear, and the forbidden (haram) is clear, between these two are doubtful matters. Whosoever abstains from these doubtful matters has saved his religion."

Works
Principal among his twenty-one works are:
Sunan Abu Dāwūd:  contains 4,800 hadithmostly sahih (authenticated), some marked ḍaʿīf (unauthenticated)usually numbered after the edition of Muhammad Muhyi al-Din `Abd al-Hamid (Cairo: Matba`at Mustafa Muhammad, 1354 AH/1935 CE), where 5,274 are distinguished.  Islamic scholar Ibn Hajar al-Asqalani, and some others, believe a number of the unmarked hadith are ḍaʿīf.
Kitab al-Marāsīl lists 600 extensively investigated sahih mursal hadith.
Risālat Abu Dāwūd ilā Ahli Makkah: letter to the people of Makkah describing his Sunan Abu Dāwūd collection.
Kitāb al-Masāhif: catalogues non-Uthmanic variants of the Qur'an text.

See also
 Kutub al-Sittah
 Sunan Abu Dawood

References

Bibliography

Further reading

External links

 Biodata at MuslimScholars.info * Biography at Sunnah.com
 Letter from Imam Abu Dawud to the people of Makkah explaining his book, terms he uses, and his methodology.

810s births
888 deaths
Iranian people of Arab descent
Hadith compilers
Hadith
Hadith studies
Taba‘ at-Tabi‘in
Hanbalis
Atharis
9th-century jurists